SB Decima is a steel Thames sailing barge constructed in Southampton in 1899 by J.G. Fay and Co, Southampton for E. J. Goldsmith of Grays, Essex.  She is back under sail and resident on the River Darent in  Dartford, Kent. She is a notable "Historic Ship".



History

The ubiquitous Thames sailing barge had evolved over a century from the small swim-headed wooden river lighter, to the efficient river and estuary vessel with a rounded bow and stem post, that would take cargoes of up to 200 tons and regularly race to test design changes. The farmer sailed vessel used on short runs on the upper reaches of the London River had been eclipsed by the hoy companies running mixed cargoes from Margate and Ipswich to the west of London, and indeed doing occasional coastal work as far as the Tyne and the Lizard.

These companies owned not one but many of the wooden barges and were commissioning barges made of iron and steel. One of the largest of these companies was Goldsmiths of Grays in Essex, a company that owned 147 barges in 1905s against the fleet of 120 run by the London and Rochester Trading Company in the 1930s. A.P.C.M. was a collection of the fleets of cement firms and they had over 300.

In 1898 they commissioned twenty-two 160 tonners 'iron-pots' from Braby in Deptford and Fay and Co in Southampton. Braby barges had square chines which enhanced their windward performance at the expense of off the wind, all the Fay barges were all built to a similar design with rounded chines. The rounded chine led to dismal performance to windward and a heavy dependency on the leeboards. The SB Decima was built to this design by Fay and Co.

As a steel ship, skippers could push her hard without fear of busting the caulking, but the ironpots were built for steady not spectacular progress. At sea they could be recognised by an undersized topsail. The barges were 'seekers' but the skippers, as Goldsmith's employers they had less freedom on which cargoes to accept and the route, that was done by the office. Goldsmith were described by Benham as ´the Pickfords of the North Sea'.

She was involved in the great 70-mile-an-hour gale of 23 November 1938 when nine barges sought assistance from lifeboats along the Suffolk coast. The lifeboat took off her crew, and she made her own way to safety on a beach in Holland. She was sunk herself in 1940 when a deck cargo of timber broke free off Southend pier. She was recovered and resumed trading.

She was sold in 1949, and became a motor barge. Her rigging was stripped away and she continued trading. She took her last cargo in 1977: scrap metal to Queenborough.

Restoration

Out of trade she was first sold to her last skipper, Beefy Wildish who re-rigged her as a charter barge with sails and motor.  In 1999 she was sold to Jeremy Taunton for use as a houseboat. The well-known sailing barge restorer and shipwright Tim Goldsack, bought Decima in 2003. He completed a major restoration. She was gutted and a substantial number of the hull and deck plates were replaced. She was given a new set of rigging and good second-hand sails. A new Gardner 6LXB engine was fitted. She was sailing again in 2004.

Decima was sponsored by the jam maker, Wilkin & Sons of Tiptree, Essex in 2010, and their logo was displayed prominently on the topsail.

She was sold by Tim Goldsack to David Leal in 2016.

In 2018 she passed along the Dartford Creek to above Dartford lock.

Rig and construction

The hull of a keel-less Thames barge was always a compromise between the cargo carrying capacity, and her sailing properties. Swim-head lighters could pack in the grain, but not sail competitively in rough water, let alone in lower reaches of the river, or on the estuary. Decima was built to work the estuary and do runs along and across the English Channel and the North Sea, she was built to an established specification and a design decision was made that should have a rounded chine and put greater use to her leeboards.

Thames barges could be rigged in many ways, and in her life she has been rigged with a loosefooted sprit-sail twice, in between acting as a motor barge. An indication of the original spars and sails can be surmised from E H March's detailed measurement of the SB Kathleen, a wooden barge doing similar work that was launched 3 years later. This is supported by a 1909 dated sailplan in Goldfinch's of Whitstable sailbook. In contrast, we have some details of the Jewish, that was built in 1899 in Barking then renamed as the HKD (official number 110075). She was a 65-ton,  by  vessel.

Spars

On the HKD, the mainmast was  heel to hounds,  heel to head, the topmast was  heel to hounds,  pole with a  headstick. Her bowsprit was  outboard.

Sails

On the HKD the sail measurements were roughly similar. She carried  of canvas in total.

The sails on a Thames barge are red ochre in colour. The sailcloth is of flax, and to be kept in a supple and waterproof condition it must be dressed. Importantly, the flax must not dry out or will chafe against the rigging or against the rails when not in use. The sailmaker's exact formula is a closely guarded secret, and sailormen believe that some dressings are faster than others. It is based on red-ochre (protects against UV) suspended in a mixture of fish oils, linseed oil, seawater and horse urine. The HKD required  of sail dressing annually.

See also
 Thalatta
 Will (Thames barge)

References

Bibliography

External links
Decima taking the low Bob Dunn Way bridge, Cllr. Conrad Broadley
Stan Mayes recollections of Hayes barges

Rivers of Kent
Dartford
Thames sailing barges
1899 ships
Transport on the River Thames
Sailing ships of the United Kingdom
Ships and vessels on the National Register of Historic Vessels